Hillcrest, New York may refer to:

Communities
Hillcrest, Broome County, New York, a residential community
Hillcrest, Rockland County, New York, a hamlet and census-designated place
Hillcrest, Queens, a neighborhood in New York City

Buildings
 Hillcrest (Cazenovia, New York), historic home listed on the National Register of Historic Places
 Hillcrest (Lima, New York), historic home